Soheila Jolodarzadeh is an Iranian reformist politician and a member of the Parliament of Iran representing Tehran, Rey, Shemiranat and Eslamshahr electoral district. Jolodarzadeh is the first woman to be elected as a ″Secretary of the Board of Parliament of Iran″ in the history of Islamic Republic.

She is member of several reformist parties, including Worker House, Islamic Labour Party, Islamic Assembly of Ladies and Association of the Women of the Islamic Republic.

Electoral history

References

1959 births
Living people
Members of the 5th Islamic Consultative Assembly
Members of the 6th Islamic Consultative Assembly
Members of the 7th Islamic Consultative Assembly
Members of the 10th Islamic Consultative Assembly
Islamic Labour Party politicians
Islamic Assembly of Ladies politicians
Worker House members
Association of the Women of the Islamic Republic politicians
Amirkabir University of Technology alumni
Members of the Women's fraction of Islamic Consultative Assembly
People from Ray, Iran
21st-century Iranian women politicians
21st-century Iranian politicians